Leo John (born 25 June 1936) is a Trinidadian former cricketer. He played twenty-five first-class matches for Trinidad and Tobago between 1958/59 and 1978/79.

References

External links
 

1936 births
Living people
Trinidad and Tobago cricketers